Elizabeth White (born c. 1950) is a Canadian animal rights activist and politician.

Early life 
White was born in Toronto, to parents who both were teachers. She earned a nursing degree at McGill University, and then worked in Kitchener, before moving back to Toronto a few years later. She was involved in political organizing, first with the New Democratic Party, beginning from age 20.

Career 
White is a founder and board member of the Animal Alliance of Canada, a non-profit organization set up in 1991, where she focuses on legislative issues, municipal animal control by-laws, hunting and human-wildlife conflict, and fundraising.

White also leads the Animal Protection Party of Canada (formerly the Animal Alliance Environment Voters Party of Canada), a federal political party registered by the Animal Alliance in 2005 with the aim of winning air time to discuss issues other parties might not raise, and to allow donors to receive tax credit. She stood unsuccessfully for election in Toronto-area ridings in 2006, 2008, 2011 and 2015.

White is an opponent of the annual Canadian seal hunt, and as a result supports a boycott of Canada's seafood industry. She has also campaigned against the sale of dogs from the Winnipeg city pound to animal researchers. She was one of three women (along with Lesli Bisgould of the University of Toronto and Shelagh MacDonald of the Canadian Federation of Humane Societies) who drafted Bill C-17B/C-10B, an anti-cruelty bill that among other things called for animals to be regarded as "living property." The Bill passed the House of Commons twice, but was defeated in the Senate in 2008.

Electoral record 

	

|-

|align="left" colspan=2|Liberal hold
|align="right"|Swing
|align="right"| +8.5
|align="right"|

|-

|align="left" colspan=2|Liberal hold
|align="right"|Swing
|align="right"| -2.1
|align="right"|

See also
 List of animal rights advocates

References

Canadian animal rights activists
Canadian activists
1950s births
Place of birth missing (living people)
Living people
Female Canadian political party leaders
Candidates in the 2006 Canadian federal election
Candidates in the 2008 Canadian federal election
Ontario candidates for Member of Parliament
Women in Ontario politics
21st-century Canadian women politicians
Canadian women activists